Ferenc Pelvássy (4 November 1910 – 6 October 1980) was a Hungarian cyclist. He competed in the tandem and team pursuit events at the 1936 Summer Olympics.

References

External links
 

1910 births
1980 deaths
Hungarian male cyclists
Olympic cyclists of Hungary
Cyclists at the 1936 Summer Olympics
Cyclists from Budapest